Beaver was launched on the Thames in 1793. She traded between London and Canada but in 1796 she became a whaler in the Southern whale fishery. The Spanish captured her in 1797 off the south American coast, shortly after the outbreak of war between Spain and Britain.

Career
Beaver first appeared in Lloyd's Register (LR) in 1793.

Alexander and Benjamin Champion acquired Beaver to sail her as a whaler in the Southern Whale Fishery. Captain Barnabas Gardner sailed from London on 8 April 1796, bound for Chile.

Beaver was near the Cape Verde Islands by 13 May. By December she was off the coast of Chile. Then on 8 March 1797 she was off Concepcion.

Fate
Spain declared war on Great Britain on 7 October 1796. However, took some time for the news to reach the Pacific. Early in 1797 the Spanish captured Lydia, Betsey, and Levant. By 23 May, the Spanish had captured Beaver, Castor, Charmilly, Jupiter, and Atlantic.

Lloyd's List reported on 13 February 1798 that Beaver, Gardner, master, was one of several British whalers that the Spanish had captured off the coasts of Chile and Peru. The report included the other vessels listed above.

Citations

References
 

1793 ships
Age of Sail merchant ships of England
Whaling ships
Captured ships